This is a list of people who have served as Custos Rotulorum of Norfolk.

 Sir Richard Southwell bef. 1544 – aft. 1547
 Sir James Boleyn bef. 1558–1561
 Sir William Woodhouse bef. 1562–1564
 Sir Christopher Heydon bef. 1573–1579
 Sir Dru Drury bef. 1584–1617
 Sir Philip Woodhouse, 1st Baronet 1617
 Thomas Howard, 21st Earl of Arundel 1617–1636
 Henry Howard, Lord Maltravers 1636–1646
 Interregnum
 Sir Philip Wodehouse, 3rd Baronet 1660–1681
 Henry Richardson, 3rd Lord Cramond 1681–1689
 Henry Howard, 7th Duke of Norfolk 1689–1701
For later custodes rotulorum, see Lord Lieutenant of Norfolk.

References

Institute of Historical Research - Custodes Rotulorum 1544-1646
Institute of Historical Research - Custodes Rotulorum 1660-1828

Norfolk